CVAC may refer to:

 Carolinas-Virginia Athletic Conference, abbreviation of the former name of the Conference Carolinas, a United States collegiate athletic conference of NCAA Division II
 Catawba Valley Athletic Conference, a United States high school athletic conference located in North Carolina
 CVac, a prospective therapeutic vaccine for ovarian cancer
 Cyclic Variations in Adaptive Conditioning, an alternative treatment for Adiposis dolorosa